Shaktawat is the name of a branch of the Sisodia Rajputs. The Shaktawats are patrilineal descendants of Prince Shakti Singh, younger brother of Maharana Pratap of Mewar dynasty. There kuldevi is Baan Mata located on chittorgarh fort.

References

See also

Rajput clans
Indian surnames